The Early Worm Gets the Bird is a 1940 Warner Bros. Merrie Melodies cartoon supervised by Tex Avery. The short was released on January 13, 1940. The name is a play on the adage "The early bird gets the worm."

Plot 
The story starts in the house of the Blackbird family. Three young birds are seen saying their bedtime prayers. Their mammy tells them goodnight, and the children get into bed to go to sleep. But, as soon as they are alone, one sits up and begins reading a book called "The Early Bird gets The Worm". He wakes the brother next to him and tries to tell him about the story, but he doesn't care. Mammy notices the light coming from the children's room so goes in and, seeing what her son is doing, grabs the book and throws it out the window. Then, she tells the three of them about the fox who eats birds and who surely, if they try to go outside early to catch a worm, will catch them.

The youngsters prepare again to go to sleep; the book-reader tells the other two that he will get up early in the morning and go catch the worm. At five a.m., he sneaks out and begins sniffing out a worm. Meanwhile, a worm has come across the discarded book and reads about the "early bird"; he decides to sniff one out. In this manner, they find each other and, frightened, each run away.

Once the bird realizes he has met the worm, he chases after him. After a few gags Bugs Bunny and Elmer Fudd style, the fox appears and holds up two signs for the audience. One says "The Villain" and the other "As if you didn't know". The fox then chases the bird as the bird is chasing the worm. Noticing the fox but not realizing it is indeed this dangerous animal, the bird stops and engages in conversation, actually believing that this creature is also an "early bird" after the worm. He shares his mammy's descriptive warning about the fox, slowly coming to realize that he is face to face with one. The young bird is captured but, as the fox is fixing him up as a sandwich, the worm - with the assistance of an angry bee - rescues him. The bird goes home and gets back into bed with his siblings just as the alarm clock rings and Mammy comes in. She asks her three children what they want for breakfast. The other two say worms, but the "early bird" says he does not want worms. The worm pops up from beneath the sheets and says he doesn't, either, then covers his mouth, followed by the iris out.

Reception
Motion Picture Exhibitor (Jan 24, 1940): "The little bird doesn't believe the story, wants to find out for himself, is caught by the bad fox, and then saved by the little worm, all of which is familiar, but made in the better Schlesinger vein. Good."

Motion Picture Herald (Oct 10, 1943): "A sidelight on the old adage, this Leon Schlesinger cartoon suggests that a bird can't be too careful."

Home media
The cartoon has not been officially released on DVD. However, it was included in the Golden Age of Looney Tunes LaserDisc/videocassette series. Additionally, it can often be found on low-quality VHS tapes and DVDs of various public domain cartoons, since the copyright on this film has not been renewed.

Notes
The cartoon was reissued in the 1943-44 season and again in the 1952-53 season.

See also
Looney Tunes
Censored Eleven

References

External links

Merrie Melodies short films
1940 short films
Stereotypes of African Americans
1940 animated films
1940s Warner Bros. animated short films
1940s English-language films
American animated short films
Films directed by Tex Avery
African-American animated films
Animated films about birds
Films about worms